Wang Qiang (Chinese 王强, born 1935 in Shandong) is a Chinese composer.

Biography
Wang Qiang began her study of composition at the Shanghai Conservatory of Music in 1955. As a third-year student she won first prize in the 1959 World Youth Music Composition Competition with the choral piece River of Fortune.  After graduating in 1960, she took a position teaching composition at the same school. She continued to work at the Conservatory until 1991, when she moved to live and work in Hong Kong.

Works
Wang Qiang composes for orchestra, chamber ensemble, operetta, choral ensemble and film and television scores.  Selected works include:

Orchestral Works:
Ga Da Mei Ling for Cello and Orchestra, 1960
La Ba and Gu for  Orchestra, 1980
Overture - Aspiration (序曲﹣希望) for Orchestra, 1992
Fantay Overture “ Love ” for Orchestra, 1993
Violin Concerto No. 0 for violin and Orchestra, 1998
Passacaglia for Orchestra, 2002

Chamber Music:
Trio for Flute, Viola and Arpa, 1979
Cello Octet Twelve pieces for Eight cellists, 1989
Cello and Contrabass Five pieces, 1989
Quartet For four Zhengs, Twelve pieces, 1990
Trio Two pieces, for Flute, Zheng and Erhu, 1991
Untitled for Flute, Cello and Percussion, 1995
Flower for Soprano, String Quartet and Guitar, 2003
Erhu and String Quartet Spring, Summer, Autumn, Winter, for Erhu and String Quartet, 2006
Celestial dream dance for Flute, Clarinet and Percussion, 2006

Choral Music:
River of Fortune  for Choral and Orchestra, 1958
Chinese Folk song Choral Three pieces for Choir and Piano, 2003

Film Scores:
Waiting for Tomorrow for Film and Orchestra, 1962
Mysteries of Bao Hu Lu for Film and Orchestra, 1963
The dawn for Film and Orchestra, 1979
Girl's Sale Cake for TV play and Orchestra, 1980

References

1935 births
Living people
Shanghai Conservatory of Music alumni
Academic staff of Shanghai Conservatory of Music
People's Republic of China composers
Chinese women classical composers
Chinese music educators
Musicians from Shandong
Educators from Shandong
Chinese classical composers
Women music educators
20th-century women composers
20th-century classical composers